The 2008–09 Toronto Raptors season is the 14th season of the franchise in the National Basketball Association (NBA). Before the season began, six-time NBA All-Star and center Jermaine O'Neal was acquired to complement Chris Bosh in the frontcourt. 17 games into the season, head coach Sam Mitchell was fired and replaced by Jay Triano. The Raptors went into the All-Star break 13 games under .500, and O'Neal was traded to Miami for Shawn Marion. The Raptors continued to struggle, and were eliminated from the playoff race with seven games of the regular season remaining.

Roster

Roster Notes
 Center Patrick O'Bryant was born and raised in the U.S., but is also a Central African citizen.

Summary

Preseason

Seeking to improve its rebounding and interior defence, Toronto traded T. J. Ford, Radoslav Nesterović, Maceo Baston, and the draft rights to Roy Hibbert to the Indiana Pacers in return for six-time NBA All-Star Jermaine O'Neal and the draft rights to Nathan Jawai. With Ford gone, virtually all the point guard responsibilities rested on José Calderón's shoulders, who re-signed to a multi-year contract. The Raptors then signed free agents Hassan Adams, Will Solomon and Jamal Sampson, but Sampson was waived at the end of the pre-season. The Raptors also signed Roko Ukić who was drafted in the 2005 NBA draft, and lost Carlos Delfino and Primož Brezec to free agency. O'Neal's arrival, however, was dwarfed by the Elton Brand signing pulled off by division rivals Philadelphia. In a pre-season poll, more than half of the general managers predicted the acquisition of Brand to be the most significant one in the league, whereas the 30-year-old O'Neal was perceived to be past his prime. Nevertheless, the prospect of Toronto deploying two proven big men at the post with some of the league's best three-point shooters waiting at the perimeter signalled a change in game plan from the previous campaign.

Regular season

The Raptors began their campaign with a 95–84 road win against Philadelphia. The match featured the new All-Star acquisitions of both teams: O'Neal for the Raptors and Brand for the 76ers. Chris Bosh and O'Neal combined for 44 points and 19 rebounds in the win. The team notched another victory in their second game—a home fixture against the Golden State Warriors—thus opening with the same 2–0 record as the season before. Andrea Bargnani, who had spent the summer buffing up his frame and working on his interior game, chalked up 5 rebounds and 3 blocks in the game that went into overtime. The Raptors then got off to their best start in four seasons when they defeated the Milwaukee Bucks in the third game, with Calderón scoring a career-high 25 points in the 91–87 win. Meanwhile, O'Neal wasted no time in imposing his style on his new team: in the season opener at Philadelphia, he pointed to hecklers in the home crowd after making a dunk; in the team's second game, he blocked a dunk from Golden State's Brandan Wright and thereafter waved a finger, as though to say "Don't come back here again."

However, the Raptors could not keep up their new game plan of solid defence and lost four of their next five games, including a blowout loss to the Atlanta Hawks and another to the Boston Celtics after relinquishing a 17-point lead. While Bosh posted impressive numbers in nearly every game, his teammates were not as consistent. Toronto's depth at the point was soon put to the test when Calderón was injured and unable to play against the rising Miami Heat. Solomon took over the reins with ease in that game and coupled with the Raptors' domination in the frontcourt led by O'Neal, Toronto secured a much needed win. Moon was also dropped to the bench, with Bargnani made the starting small forward. This performance came to naught in the next game against the Orlando Magic, where although Bosh and O'Neal combined for 54 points and 28 boards, the lack of production and defence from the wing, coupled with the inability to protect possession, brought Toronto back to .500. As though to prove a point, Bargnani and Anthony Parker combined for 44 points the next day in the win against Miami, while the tandem of Bosh and O'Neal secured 28 rebounds. This run was not sustained yet again, as Toronto lost a further two games on the trot: an overtime loss to New Jersey and another blowout loss to Boston, where the Raptors set a franchise record for highest field goal percentage (62%) conceded at home. That game also saw Bosh unleash a bout of angry frustration at his team as the Raptors plummeted to the bottom of the division standings.

On 3 December 2008, with the Raptors posting an 8–9 record 17 games into the season, Raptors' head coach Sam Mitchell was fired and replaced by longtime assistant Jay Triano on an interim basis. Triano—the first Canadian head coach in NBA history—immediately pointed to Toronto's bottom-of-the-league in fast break points as a major deficiency he wanted to overcome. However, the Raptors slipped a further three games to go 8–12 before it recovered with a two-game turnaround. In those two games, Triano attempted to introduce a new style of play: maximum protection of the paint. He also brought Kapono and Moon into the starting line-up and this seemed to work for a while before Toronto lost the next five games to go seven under .500, including a loss to the 2–24 Oklahoma City Thunder. Toronto ended up 4–11 in December under Triano, but got off to a good start in January with wins over Houston and Orlando before going down in a crucial game against Milwaukee. January also saw Bargnani emerging as a legitimate starting center with him averaging over 21 points and 6.6 rebounds over a 16-game stretch and Ukić showing good signs of adaptation to the NBA, but all this was overshadowed by the injuries that O'Neal and Calderón sustained and the resulting mounting losses. Given the Raptors' perpetual inability to win close games and hold on to leads, the team went on a seven-game losing streak before the return of O'Neal and Calderón saw them move to 19–28. Toronto then went on a six-game losing streak and dropped further down the pecking order with a 21–34 record going into the All-Star break. With Toronto looking to bring in a wing player and free up the salary space, O'Neal and Moon were traded to Miami for Shawn Marion and Marcus Banks on 13 February 2009. Six days later, Solomon was moved in a three-way deal, resulting in Toronto acquiring a big man in centre Patrick O'Bryant from Boston. Pops Mensah-Bonsu and Quincy Douby were also signed on 6 March and 24 March 2009 respectively.

Even with the new acquisitions, Toronto continued losing games, one of which was a blowout 97–127 loss to New York. Combined with a seven-game losing streak leading up to mid-March, this evaporated any hopes of making the playoffs. The only improvement came in the form of more fastbreak points and points scored in the paint, and the team even kickstarted a six-game winning streak in the last week of March, their longest winning streak in seven seasons. The Raptors were also eliminated from playoffs contention at the same time when the streak ended, with seven games of the regular season to go. They ended the season with a three-game winning streak, an overall record of 33–49, and were ranked 13th in the Conference.

Standings

Game log

Regular season

|- bgcolor="#bbffbb"
| 1
| October 29
| @ Philadelphia
| 
| Chris Bosh (27)
| Chris Bosh (11)
| José Calderón (7)
| Wachovia Center15,750
| 1–0
|- bgcolor="#bbffbb"
| 2
| October 31
| Golden State
| 
| Chris Bosh (31)
| Chris Bosh (9)
| José Calderón (13)
| Air Canada Centre19,800
| 2–0

|- bgcolor="#bbffbb"
| 3
| November 1
| @ Milwaukee
| 
| José Calderón (25)
| Chris Bosh (10)
| José Calderón (9)
| Bradley Center17,036
| 3–0
|- bgcolor="#ffcccc"
| 4
| November 5
| Detroit
| 
| Chris Bosh (26)
| Chris Bosh (13)
| José Calderón (8)
| Air Canada Centre18,602
| 3–1
|- bgcolor="#ffcccc"
| 5
| November 7
| @ Atlanta
| 
| Chris Bosh (26)
| Chris Bosh (8)
| José Calderón (12)
| Philips Arena18,290
| 3–2
|- bgcolor="#bbffbb"
| 6
| November 9
| @ Charlotte
| 
| Chris Bosh (30)
| Chris Bosh (15)
| José Calderón (7)
| Time Warner Cable Arena12,111
| 4–2
|- bgcolor="#ffcccc"
| 7
| November 10
| @ Boston
| 
| Jermaine O'Neal (23)
| Jermaine O'Neal (11)
| José Calderón (10)
| TD Banknorth Garden18,624
| 4–3
|- bgcolor="#ffcccc"
| 8
| November 12
| Philadelphia
| 
| Chris Bosh (30)
| Chris Bosh (12)
| José Calderón (6)
| Air Canada Centre18,093
| 4–4
|- bgcolor="#bbffbb"
| 9
| November 16
| Miami
| 
| Chris Bosh (27)
| Jermaine O'Neal (18)
| Will Solomon (11)
| Air Canada Centre19,800
| 5–4
|- bgcolor="#ffcccc"
| 10
| November 18
| @ Orlando
| 
| Chris Bosh (40)
| Chris Bosh (18)
| Chris Bosh, Will Solomon (4)
| Amway Arena16,353
| 5–5
|- bgcolor="#bbffbb"
| 11
| November 19
| @ Miami
| 
| Andrea Bargnani (25)
| Jermaine O'Neal (17)
| José Calderón (7)
| American Airlines Arena15,014
| 6–5
|- bgcolor="#ffcccc"
| 12
| November 21
| New Jersey
| 
| Chris Bosh (42)
| Andrea Bargnani (10)
| José Calderón (15)
| Air Canada Centre19,800
| 6–6
|- bgcolor="#ffcccc"
| 13
| November 23
| Boston
| 
| Chris Bosh (24)
| Andrea Bargnani (7)
| José Calderón (9)
| Air Canada Centre19,800
| 6–7
|- bgcolor="#bbffbb"
| 14
| November 26
| Charlotte
| 
| Chris Bosh (39)
| Chris Bosh (11)
| José Calderón (9)
| Air Canada Centre17,414
| 7–7
|- bgcolor="#bbffbb"
| 15
| November 28
| Atlanta
| 
| Chris Bosh (30)
| Chris Bosh (10)
| José Calderón (11)
| Air Canada Centre19,200
| 8–7
|- bgcolor="#ffcccc"
| 16
| November 30
| @ L.A. Lakers
| 
| Anthony Parker (19)
| Andrea Bargnani (11)
| José Calderón (12)
| Staples Center18,997
| 8–8

|- bgcolor="#ffcccc"
| 17
| December 2
| @ Denver
| 
| Chris Bosh (24)
| Chris Bosh (12)
| José Calderón (7)
| Pepsi Center14,243
| 8–9
|- bgcolor="#ffcccc"
| 18
| December 5
| @ Utah
| 
| Chris Bosh (18)
| Chris Bosh (11)
| José Calderón (8)
| EnergySolutions Arena19,911
| 8–10
|- bgcolor="#ffcccc"
| 19
| December 7
| Portland
| 
| Jermaine O'Neal (24)
| Jermaine O'Neal (8)
| José Calderón (13)
| Air Canada Centre17,671
| 8–11
|- bgcolor="#ffcccc"
| 20
| December 9
| @ Cleveland
| 
| Joey Graham (17)
| Chris Bosh (11)
| Jermaine O'Neal (4)
| Quicken Loans Arena20,049
| 8–12
|- bgcolor="#bbffbb"
| 21
| December 10
| Indiana
| 
| Jason Kapono (25)
| Chris Bosh (10)
| José Calderón (14)
| Air Canada Centre17,877
| 9–12
|- bgcolor="#bbffbb"
| 22
| December 12
| @ New Jersey
| 
| Chris Bosh (18)
| Jamario Moon (9)
| Roko Ukić (5)
| Izod Center13,926
| 10–12
|- bgcolor="#ffcccc"
| 23
| December 14
| New Orleans
| 
| Chris Bosh (25)
| Chris Bosh, Jamario Moon (8)
| José Calderón (7)
| Air Canada Centre18,537
| 10–13
|- bgcolor="#ffcccc"
| 24
| December 15
| New Jersey
| 
| Chris Bosh, Jason Kapono (17)
| Chris Bosh, Jamario Moon (9)
| José Calderón (8)
| Air Canada Centre18,561
| 10–14
|- bgcolor="#ffcccc"
| 25
| December 17
| Dallas
| 
| Jermaine O'Neal (19)
| Chris Bosh, Jamario Moon (9)
| José Calderón (10)
| Air Canada Centre18,832
| 10–15
|- bgcolor="#ffcccc"
| 26
| December 19
| @ Oklahoma City
| 
| Chris Bosh (22)
| Chris Bosh (16)
| José Calderón (8)
| Ford Center18,806
| 10–16
|- bgcolor="#ffcccc"
| 27
| December 20
| @ San Antonio
| 
| Jermaine O'Neal (24)
| Chris Bosh, Jermaine O'Neal (10)
| Chris Bosh, José Calderón (4)
| AT&T Center17,227
| 10–17
|- bgcolor="#bbffbb"
| 28
| December 22
| @ L.A. Clippers
| 
| Chris Bosh (31)
| Jermaine O'Neal (9)
| José Calderón (9)
| Staples Center16,094
| 11–17
|- bgcolor="#bbffbb"
| 29
| December 26
| @ Sacramento
| 
| Jermaine O'Neal (36)
| Jermaine O'Neal (9)
| José Calderón (6)
| ARCO Arena12,059
| 12–17
|- bgcolor="#ffcccc"
| 30
| December 27
| @ Portland
| 
| Chris Bosh (29)
| Chris Bosh (9)
| José Calderón (8)
| Rose Garden Arena20,588
| 12–18
|- bgcolor="#ffcccc"
| 31
| December 29
| @ Golden State
| 
| Chris Bosh (30)
| Chris Bosh (14)
| José Calderón (16)
| Oracle Arena19,596
| 12–19
|- bgcolor="#ffcccc"
| 32
| December 31
| Denver
| 
| Andrea Bargnani (26)
| Chris Bosh (11)
| José Calderón (11)
| Air Canada Centre18,879
| 12–20

|- bgcolor="#bbffbb"
| 33
| January 2
| Houston
| 
| Andrea Bargnani, Chris Bosh (19)
| Anthony Parker, Jake Voskuhl (8)
| Will Solomon (7)
| Air Canada Centre19,800
| 13–20
|- bgcolor="#bbffbb"
| 34
| January 4
| Orlando
| 
| Anthony Parker (26)
| Chris Bosh (11)
| Roko Ukić (7)
| Air Canada Centre19,322
| 14–20
|- bgcolor="#ffcccc"
| 35
| January 5
| @ Milwaukee
| 
| Chris Bosh (31)
| Chris Bosh (11)
| Will Solomon (11)
| Bradley Center12,599
| 14–21
|- bgcolor="#bbffbb"
| 36
| January 7
| @ Washington
| 
| Andrea Bargnani (25)
| Chris Bosh, Joey Graham (8)
| Chris Bosh (6)
| Verizon Center13,864
| 15–21
|- bgcolor="#bbffbb"
| 37
| January 9
| Memphis
| 
| Chris Bosh (32)
| Chris Bosh (10)
| Will Solomon (9)
| Air Canada Centre18,486
| 16–21
|- bgcolor="#ffcccc"
| 38
| January 11
| Boston
| 
| Andrea Bargnani (17)
| Chris Bosh (11)
| Andrea Bargnani, José Calderón, Will Solomon, Roko Ukić (3)
| Air Canada Centre19,800
| 16–22
|- bgcolor="#ffcccc"
| 39
| January 12
| @ Boston
| 
| Andrea Bargnani (23)
| Chris Bosh (11)
| Will Solomon (5)
| TD Banknorth Garden18,624
| 16–23
|- bgcolor="#ffcccc"
| 40
| January 14
| Chicago
| 
| Andrea Bargnani (31)
| Andrea Bargnani (10)
| Will Solomon (7)
| Air Canada Centre18,494
| 16–24
|- bgcolor="#ffcccc"
| 41
| January 16
| @ Indiana
| 
| Chris Bosh (25)
| Chris Bosh (16)
| Anthony Parker (5)
| Conseco Fieldhouse13,234
| 16–25
|- bgcolor="#ffcccc"
| 42
| January 18
| Phoenix
| 
| Anthony Parker (26)
| Chris Bosh (12)
| Anthony Parker (5)
| Air Canada Centre19,800
| 16–26
|- bgcolor="#ffcccc"
| 43
| January 19
| @ Atlanta
| 
| Chris Bosh (22)
| Chris Bosh (14)
| Anthony Parker (9)
| Philips Arena17,199
| 16–27
|- bgcolor="#ffcccc"
| 44
| January 21
| @ Detroit
| 
| Chris Bosh (19)
| Jamario Moon (7)
| Anthony Parker (8)
| The Palace of Auburn Hills22,076
| 16–28
|- bgcolor="#bbffbb"
| 45
| January 23
| @ Chicago
| 
| José Calderón (23)
| Chris Bosh (6)
| José Calderón (10)
| United Center20,886
| 17–28
|- bgcolor="#bbffbb"
| 46
| January 25
| Sacramento
| 
| Chris Bosh (31)
| Jermaine O'Neal (10)
| José Calderón (8)
| Air Canada Centre18,127
| 18–28
|- bgcolor="#bbffbb"
| 47
| January 28
| @ New Jersey
| 
| Anthony Parker (21)
| Anthony Parker (7)
| José Calderón (11)
| Izod Center10,138
| 19–28
|- bgcolor="#ffcccc"
| 48
| January 30
| Milwaukee
| 
| Chris Bosh (18)
| Chris Bosh (9)
| José Calderón (11)
| Air Canada Centre18,791
| 19–29

|- bgcolor="#ffcccc"
| 49
| February 1
| Orlando
| 
| José Calderón (16)
| Joey Graham (12)
| José Calderón, Will Solomon (5)
| Air Canada Centre19,800
| 19–30
|- bgcolor="#ffcccc"
| 50
| February 3
| @ Cleveland
| 
| Chris Bosh (29)
| Andrea Bargnani (10)
| Anthony Parker (8)
| Quicken Loans Arena20,562
| 19–31
|- bgcolor="#ffcccc"
| 51
| February 4
| L.A. Lakers
| 
| Joey Graham (24)
| Andrea Bargnani, Jermaine O'Neal (9)
| Anthony Parker (9)
| Air Canada Centre19,800
| 19–32
|- bgcolor="#ffcccc"
| 52
| February 6
| @ New Orleans
| 
| Jermaine O'Neal (24)
| Jamario Moon (7)
| José Calderón (9)
| New Orleans Arena17,319
| 19–33
|- bgcolor="#ffcccc"
| 53
| February 7
| @ Memphis
| 
| José Calderón (18)
| Andrea Bargnani, Jamario Moon (9)
| José Calderón (5)
| FedExForum11,498
| 19–34
|- bgcolor="#bbffbb"
| 54
| February 10
| @ Minnesota
| 
| Joey Graham (24)
| Jamario Moon (9)
| José Calderón (9)
| Target Center12,722
| 20–34
|- bgcolor="#bbffbb"
| 55
| February 11
| San Antonio
| 
| Andrea Bargnani (23)
| Jermaine O'Neal (10)
| Anthony Parker (4)
| Air Canada Centre18,909
| 21–34
|- bgcolor="#ffcccc"
| 56
| February 18
| Cleveland
| 
| Joey Graham (15)
| Anthony Parker (7)
| Shawn Marion (6)
| Air Canada Centre19,800
| 21–35
|- bgcolor="#ffcccc"
| 57
| February 20
| @ New York
| 
| Joey Graham (19)
| Shawn Marion (12)
| José Calderón (10)
| Madison Square Garden19,763
| 21–36
|- bgcolor="#bbffbb"
| 58
| February 22
| New York
| 
| Andrea Bargnani (28)
| Shawn Marion (15)
| José Calderón (11)
| Air Canada Centre19,800
| 22–36
|- bgcolor="#bbffbb"
| 59
| February 24
| Minnesota
| 
| Andrea Bargnani, Chris Bosh (26)
| Shawn Marion (8)
| José Calderón (13)
| Air Canada Centre17,457
| 23–36
|- bgcolor="#ffcccc"
| 60
| February 27
| @ Phoenix
| 
| Shawn Marion (27)
| Shawn Marion (12)
| José Calderón (5)
| US Airways Center18,422
| 23–37

|- bgcolor="#ffcccc"
| 61
| March 1
| @ Dallas
| 
| Chris Bosh (28)
| Chris Bosh (10)
| Anthony Parker (7)
| American Airlines Center19,688
| 23–38
|- bgcolor="#ffcccc"
| 62
| March 3
| @ Houston
| 
| Andrea Bargnani, Chris Bosh (25)
| Shawn Marion (10)
| José Calderón (16)
| Toyota Center16,291
| 23–39
|- bgcolor="#ffcccc"
| 63
| March 6
| Miami
| 
| Chris Bosh (34)
| Pops Mensah-Bonsu (10)
| Anthony Parker (9)
| Air Canada Centre19,800
| 23–40
|- bgcolor="#ffcccc"
| 64
| March 8
| Utah
| 
| Chris Bosh (30)
| Chris Bosh (10)
| José Calderón (11)
| Air Canada Centre18,541
| 23–41
|- bgcolor="#ffcccc"
| 65
| March 11
| @ Philadelphia
| 
| Andrea Bargnani (21)
| Pops Mensah-Bonsu (8)
| José Calderón (6)
| Wachovia Center17,292
| 23–42
|- bgcolor="#ffcccc"
| 66
| March 13
| Detroit
| 
| Chris Bosh (27)
| Chris Bosh, Pops Mensah-Bonsu (10)
| José Calderón (11)
| Air Canada Centre19,800
| 23–43
|- bgcolor="#bbffbb"
| 67
| March 15
| Indiana
| 
| Andrea Bargnani (27)
| Chris Bosh (13)
| José Calderón (12)
| Air Canada Centre18,169
| 24–43
|- bgcolor="#ffcccc"
| 68
| March 16
| @ Charlotte
| 
| Chris Bosh (18)
| Chris Bosh (14)
| José Calderón (8)
| Time Warner Cable Arena11,349
| 24–44
|- bgcolor="#ffcccc"
| 69
| March 20
| Charlotte
| 
| Chris Bosh (35)
| Andrea Bargnani, Chris Bosh (7)
| José Calderón (11)
| Air Canada Centre18,641
| 24–45
|- bgcolor="#bbffbb"
| 70
| March 22
| L.A. Clippers
| 
| Chris Bosh (16)
| Chris Bosh, Shawn Marion (13)
| Roko Ukić (8)
| Air Canada Centre17,610
| 25–45
|- bgcolor="#bbffbb"
| 71
| March 25
| Milwaukee
| 
| Andrea Bargnani (23)
| Chris Bosh (14)
| José Calderón (11)
| Air Canada Centre17,401
| 26–45
|- bgcolor="#bbffbb"
| 72
| March 27
| Oklahoma City
| 
| Chris Bosh (21)
| Chris Bosh (13)
| Roko Ukić (10)
| Air Canada Centre17,127
| 27–45
|- bgcolor="#bbffbb"
| 73
| March 29
| Chicago
| 
| Chris Bosh (31)
| Chris Bosh (15)
| José Calderón (19)
| Air Canada Centre18,949
| 28–45

|- bgcolor="#bbffbb"
| 74
| April 1
| @ Orlando
| 
| Chris Bosh (24)
| Shawn Marion (15)
| José Calderón (8)
| Amway Arena17,461
| 29–45
|- bgcolor="#bbffbb"
| 75
| April 4
| @ New York
| 
| Andrea Bargnani (23)
| Chris Bosh, Shawn Marion (13)
| José Calderón (7)
| Madison Square Garden19,763
| 30–45
|- bgcolor="#ffcccc"
| 76
| April 5
| New York
| 
| Chris Bosh (31)
| Chris Bosh (14)
| José Calderón (6)
| Air Canada Centre18,879
| 30–46
|- bgcolor="#ffcccc"
| 77
| April 7
| Atlanta
| 
| Chris Bosh (21)
| Chris Bosh (10)
| José Calderón (13)
| Air Canada Centre17,613
| 30–47
|- bgcolor="#ffcccc"
| 78
| April 8
| @ Indiana
| 
| Chris Bosh (21)
| Chris Bosh (9)
| Roko Ukić (7)
| Conseco Fieldhouse13,647
| 30–48
|- bgcolor="#ffcccc"
| 79
| April 10
| Washington
| 
| Chris Bosh (21)
| Chris Bosh (10)
| José Calderón (11)
| Air Canada Centre18,107
| 30–49
|- bgcolor="#bbffbb"
| 80
| April 12
| Philadelphia
| 
| Chris Bosh (22)
| Chris Bosh (8)
| José Calderón (11)
| Air Canada Centre18,018
| 31–49
|- bgcolor="#bbffbb"
| 81
| April 13
| @ Washington
| 
| Chris Bosh, Shawn Marion (25)
| Chris Bosh, Shawn Marion (15)
| José Calderón (12)
| Verizon Center18,455
| 32–49
|- bgcolor="#bbffbb"
| 82
| April 15
| @ Chicago
| 
| Shawn Marion (34)
| Chris Bosh (19)
| José Calderón (14)
| United Center20,677
| 33–49

Player statistics

Regular season

|-
| 
| 12 || 0 || 4.3 || .308 || .000 || .500 || 0.6 || 0.1 || 0.08 || 0.08 || 0.9
|-
| 
| 6 || 0 || 6.7 || .333 || .200 || .333 || 0.5 || 1.0 || 0.17 || 0.00 || 2.3
|-
| 
| 78 || 59 || 31.4 || .450 || .409 || .831 || 5.3 || 1.2 || 0.44 || 1.24 || 15.4
|-
| 
| 77 || style="background:#d3d3d3;" | 77 || style="background:#d3d3d3;" | 38.0 || .487 || .245 || .817 || style="background:#d3d3d3;" | 10.0 || 2.5 || 0.87 || 1.00 || style="background:#d3d3d3;" | 22.7
|-
| 
| 68 || 68 || 34.3 || .497 || .406 || style="background:#d3d3d3;" | .981 || 2.9 || style="background:#d3d3d3;" | 8.9 || 1.09 || 0.10 || 12.8
|-
| 
| 7 || 0 || 10.4 || .545 || style="background:#d3d3d3;" | .444 || .750 || 1.0 || 1.7 || 0.43 || 0.00 || 4.4
|-
| 
| 78 || 10 || 19.8 || .481 || .188 || .825 || 3.7 || 0.6 || 0.45 || 0.15 || 7.7
|-
| 
| 29 || 0 || 9.1 || .422 || .000 || .792 || 2.4 || 0.3 || 0.28 || 0.21 || 3.9
|-
| 
| 6 || 0 || 3.2 || .250 || .000 || .000 || 0.3 || 0.0 || 0.00 || 0.00 || 0.3
|-
| 
| style="background:#d3d3d3;" | 80 || 12 || 22.9 || .432 || .428 || .810 || 2.0 || 1.3 || 0.28 || 0.04 || 8.2
|-
| 
| 27 || 27 || 35.3 || .488 || .154 || .806 || 8.3 || 2.3 || 1.15 || 0.78 || 14.3
|-
| 
| 19 || 0 || 13.8 || .354 || .000 || .683 || 5.4 || 0.3 || 0.47 || 0.21 || 5.1
|-
| 
| 54 || 39 || 25.5 || .473 || .345 || .846 || 4.6 || 1.3 || 1.20 || 0.81 || 7.3
|-
| 
| 13 || 3 || 11.3 || style="background:#d3d3d3;" | .547 || .000 || .375 || 2.5 || 0.2 || 0.15 || 0.85 || 4.7
|-
| 
| 41 || 34 || 29.7 || .473 || .000 || .810 || 7.0 || 1.6 || 0.44 || style="background:#d3d3d3;" | 2.00 || 13.5
|-
| 
| style="background:#d3d3d3;" | 80 || 71 || 33.0 || .426 || .390 || .834 || 4.0 || 3.4 || style="background:#d3d3d3;" | 1.25 || 0.19 || 10.7
|-
| 
| 39 || 9 || 13.9 || .436 || .263 || .833 || 1.1 || 3.2 || 0.51 || 0.10 || 4.9
|-
| 
| 72 || 0 || 12.4 || .380 || .177 || .733 || 1.0 || 2.1 || 0.42 || 0.03 || 4.2
|-
| 
| 38 || 1 || 6.3 || .267 || .000 || .786 || 1.6 || 0.2 || 0.08 || 0.11 || 0.9
|}
*Statistics with the Toronto Raptors

References

External links
 2008–09 Toronto Raptors season at Basketball Reference
 2008–09 Toronto Raptors season at Database Basketball

Toronto Raptors seasons
Toronto
Tor